Crop reports are reports compiled by the National Agricultural Statistics Service (NASS) on various commodities that are released throughout the year.  Information in the reports includes estimates on planted acreage, yield, and expected production, as well as comparison of production from previous years.

References 

 

United States Department of Agriculture